Peitz (Lower Sorbian Picnjo) is a town in the district of Spree-Neiße, in Lower Lusatia, Brandenburg, Germany.

Overview
It is situated 13 km northeast of Cottbus. Surrounded by freshwater lakes, it is well known for its fishing industry.  The town was at one time on the border between the states of Brandenburg and Saxony, and was formerly protected by strong artillery fortifications built in brick, dating from the 16th century. Only small parts of these remain.

History
From 1815 to 1947, Peitz was part of the Prussian Province of Brandenburg. From 1952 to 1990, it was part of the Bezirk Cottbus of East Germany.

Demography

Noted People

Lilly Kann (British film character actress) - (Born Peitz, 1893). Though the BFI website claims she was born in Berlin.

References

External links

Populated places in Spree-Neiße